Beğerli is a village in the District of Nazilli, Aydın Province, Turkey. As of 2010, it had a population of 747 people.

References

Villages in Nazilli District